Sévérac is a commune in the Loire-Atlantique department in western France.

Severac may also refer to:

People
 Jacques Séverac (1902–1982), French film director and screenwriter
 Amaury de Sévérac (fl. 1422–1427), Marshal of France
 Déodat de Séverac (1872–1921), French composer
 Jordanus of Severac (fl. 1280–1330), European Catholic bishop in India

Places
 Sévérac-d'Aveyron, a former commune in Aveyron, France
 Sévérac-le-Château, a former commune in Aveyron, France
 Château de Sévérac
 Sévérac-l'Église, a former commune in Aveyron, France
 Laissac-Sévérac-l'Église, a commune in Aveyron, France